Drietoma  is a village and municipality in the Trenčín District in the Trenčín Region of northwestern Slovakia.

History
In historical records the village was first mentioned in 1244.

Geography
The municipality lies at an elevation of 242 metres and covers an area of 35.83 km². It has a population of about 2,238 people.

Genealogical resources

The records for genealogical research are available at the state archive "Statny Archiv in Bratislava, Slovakia"

 Roman Catholic church records (births/marriages/deaths): 1714-1896 (parish A)
 Lutheran church records (births/marriages/deaths): 1783-1895 (parish B)

See also
 List of municipalities and towns in Slovakia

External links
https://web.archive.org/web/20071116010355/http://www.statistics.sk/mosmis/eng/run.html
Surnames of living people in Drietoma

Villages and municipalities in Trenčín District